The 67th edition of the Vuelta a Colombia was held from 1 to 13 August 2017.

Route

Classifications

References

 
 

Colombia
Vuelta a Colombia
Vuelta Colombia